JumpStart Adventures 4th Grade: Sapphire Falls is a personal computer game released by Knowledge Adventure on December 3, 1999 to replace their earlier JumpStart Adventures 4th Grade: Haunted Island released in 1996, which is, compared to its predecessor, more kid-friendly.

Gameplay and plot
In the game, a hairy, bipedal creature invades an old, abandoned mine in the town of Sapphire Falls. Scaring away tourists, the creature succeeds in stealing a mysterious treasure map that no one has ever been able to read. Two aspiring fourth-grade reporters named Sally and T.J. along with their pint-sized dog Gizmo travel to the mine to solve the mystery.

References

1999 video games
JumpStart
Windows games
Classic Mac OS games
Video games developed in the United States
Video games with alternate endings
Single-player video games